Campiglossa doronici is a species of tephritid or fruit flies in the genus Campiglossa of the family Tephritidae.

Distribution
The species is found in Poland, Austria, the Czech Republic, Romania, Ukraine.

References

Tephritinae
Insects described in 1856
Diptera of Europe
Taxa named by Hermann Loew